Singosari is a district in Malang Regency, East Java, Indonesia. It covers an area of 118.51 km2 and had a population of 165,357 at the 2010 Census and 180,050 at the 2020 Census. It is situated about 400 m above sea-level, and is therefore quite cool especially from June to August. Temperature hovers around 18–20 degrees Celsius at night.

History
The name Singosari is derived from Singhasari, a famous Javanese medieval kingdom (1222–1292), which palace located not far away from modern Singosari District.

Economy and demography
It is predominantly occupied by Javanese with smaller number of Madurese, Chinese, Arabs and other groups. Singosari district is located on the main highway connecting Surabaya, the capital of East Java province, and Malang city. The main activity is at the Singosari market. A small airport, Abdul Rachman Saleh, has been constructed to facilitate air travel between Malang and Jakarta.

Interesting places
There are a couple of places of interest in Singosari such as the Candi Singhasari, dated to the 13th century, Sumberawan stupa  and the 3339 m high Mount Arjuno. It is a moderate 2 day climb including the return trip. There are also natural springs in the area.

Further to the west from this temple is Ken Dedes swimming pool, believed to be the bathing place and royal garden of Singhasari. Upon entering this pool complex there are 2 big statues called Dwarapala at each side of the entrance. Dwarapala is a squatting giant holding big staff as a weapon, symbolizing the guard of holy places in Javanese culture.

References

Populated places in East Java